Darby Township is one of the fifteen townships of Pickaway County, Ohio, United States.  The 2000 census found 3,492 people in the township, 3,486 of whom lived in the unincorporated portions of the township.

Geography
Located in the northwestern corner of the county, it borders the following townships:
Pleasant Township, Franklin County - north
Scioto Township - east
Muhlenberg Township - southeast
Monroe Township - south
Pleasant Township, Madison County - west
Fairfield Township, Madison County - northwest

Part of the village of Harrisburg is located in northern Darby Township, and the unincorporated community of Derby lies in the center of the township.

Name and history
Statewide, other Darby Townships are located in Madison and Union Counties.

Darby Township was settled chiefly by emigrants from Virginia.

Government
The township is governed by a three-member board of trustees, who are elected in November of odd-numbered years to a four-year term beginning on the following January 1. Two are elected in the year after the presidential election and one is elected in the year before it. There is also an elected township fiscal officer, who serves a four-year term beginning on April 1 of the year after the election, which is held in November of the year before the presidential election. Vacancies in the fiscal officership or on the board of trustees are filled by the remaining trustees.

References

External links
County website

Townships in Pickaway County, Ohio
Townships in Ohio